Kirby Sigston is a village and civil parish in the Hambleton district of North Yorkshire, England, approximately  east of Northallerton. The village is situated on the Cod Beck river, and the wider parish contains the hamlet of Jeater Houses due east of the village on the trunk A19 road. The village is mentioned in the Domesday Book of 1086 as having 75 ploughlands, and its name derives from a combination of the Old Norse  Kirkju-býr (a village with a church) and Sigges tūn (Sigge's farmstead or settlement). Sigston is also the name of a village nearby.

During the 14th century the parish was part of a huge deer park and hunting area on the eastern side of what is now known as the Vale of Mowbray. A deserted medieval village (DMV) lies to the south of the church.

The population taken at the 2011 Census was fewer than 100, so details are included in the civil parish of Winton, Stank and Hallikeld. North Yorkshire County Council estimated the population of the village in 2015 to be 100 people, an increase of ten since the 2011 census. The village has never had a shop, post office or pub, and its school, which opened in 1846 and would have taken around 35 pupils, closed down in 1944.

To the north is the site of Sigston Castle, a fourteenth-century quadrangular castle, surrounded by a now largely dry moat. South of Sigston Castle, near the grade II listed Manor House, is St Lawrence's church. The church is largely Norman but the tower was renovated in the 18th century. The grade I listed church is decorated with carvings of dragons, which Pevsner states shows the Danish influence in the area.

Kirby Sigston is referred to in The Mountain Goats' song "Going to Kirby Sigston".

Notable residents
The Prime Minister of the United Kingdom, and Conservative MP for Richmond (Yorks), Rishi Sunak, currently lives in Kirby Sigston as his constituency home.

References

External links

 

Villages in North Yorkshire
Civil parishes in North Yorkshire